The Seri Setia Komuter station is a commuter train station located nearby Sungai Way, Petaling Jaya, Selangor, and served by the Port Klang Line of the KTM Komuter service.

Name
The station was formerly a freight station named Guinness Station in the 1980s, it was named after the Guinness brewery located adjacent to the station,  while nowadays "Seri Setia" originate from nearby new village - Sungai Way's official name, Seri Setia New Village. Therefore, there is a link bridge from this station to Sungai Way village across the Federal Highway.

Gallery

References

External links
 Official Keretapi Tanah Melayu site

Railway stations in Selangor
Rapid transit stations in Selangor
Port Klang Line